Coolabunia is a rural locality in the South Burnett Region, Queensland, Australia.

Geography
The D'Aguilar Highway passes through from south-east to north-west. 

Hornley is a neighbourhood. It takes its name from the Hornley railway station name, which was named  on 15 March 1911 after Ezra Horne and Hubert Horne, who were pioneer selectors in the area around 1887.

History 

The locality name is derived from the Waka language, Bujiebara dialect, Gowrburra clan words "koala" and "buani" (meaning sleeping), as the area was a camp site on Aboriginal walking tracks to the Bunya Mountains. Coolabunia railway station, named for the locality, was on the former Nanango railway line.

Coolabunia Provisional School opened on 16 June 1891. On 1 January 1909, it became Coolabunia State School.

Coolabunia West Provisional School opened on 13 June 1904. On 1 January 1909, it became Coolabunia West State School. It closed circa 1936.

Coolabunia Methodist Church was built in 1914. It could seat 120 people. It was built from timber at a cost of £100. It has closed.

Education 
Coolabunia State School is a government primary (Prep-6) school for boys and girls at 2-26 Gipps Street. In 2018, the school had an enrolment of 104 students with 9 teachers (7 full-time equivalent) and 8 non-teaching staff (5 full-time equivalent).

There are no secondary schools in Coolabunia. The nearest government seconary schools are Kingaroy State High School in neighbouring Kingaroy to the north-west and Nanango State High School in Nanango to the south-east.

Attractions 
A bora ring, accessible to the public, is in the locality.

References

External links 

 

South Burnett Region
Localities in Queensland